The 2005 Prix de l'Arc de Triomphe was a horse race held at Longchamp on Sunday 2 October 2005. It was the 84th running of the Prix de l'Arc de Triomphe.

The winner was Hurricane Run, a three-year-old colt trained in France by André Fabre. The winning jockey was Kieren Fallon.

Race details
 Sponsor: Groupe Lucien Barrière
 Purse: €1,800,000; First prize: €1,028,520 
 Going: Good to Soft
 Distance: 2,400 metres
 Number of runners: 15
 Winner's time: 2m 27.4s

Full result

 Abbreviations: shd = short-head; nk = neck

Winner's details
Further details of the winner, Hurricane Run.
 Sex: Colt
 Foaled: 13 April 2002
 Country: Ireland
 Sire: Montjeu; Dam: Hold On (Surumu)
 Owner: Michael Tabor
 Breeder: Gestüt Ammerland

References

External links
 Colour Chart – Arc 2005

Prix de l'Arc de Triomphe
 2005
Prix de l'Arc de Triomphe
Prix de l'Arc de Triomphe
Prix de l'Arc de Triomphe